The 1955 Orange Bowl was the 21st edition of the college football bowl game, held in Miami, Florida, on Saturday, January 1. It matched the Duke Blue Devils of the Atlantic Coast Conference (ACC) and the Nebraska Cornhuskers of the Big Seven Conference. Duke, ranked fourteenth in both polls, was favored by two touchdowns, and won, 34–7.

Unranked Nebraska was the Big Seven runner-up to undefeated Oklahoma, the defending Orange Bowl champions. The Sooners were not invited due to the conference's no-repeat rule for the postseason.

Included in the record attendance was Vice President Richard Nixon, an alumnus of Duke's law school.

Teams

Both teams were making their first Orange Bowl appearance.

Duke

The Blue Devils won all four of their conference games; they tied Purdue and lost to both Army and Navy. This was Duke's fourth bowl game appearance, and the first in ten years.

Nebraska

The unranked Huskers were making their second bowl appearance, the other was fourteen years earlier. Nebraska had four losses in the regular season, the last was a 55–7 drubbing at #3 Oklahoma.

Scoring summary
First quarter
No scoring
Second quarter
Duke – Bob Pascal 7-yard run (Jim Nelson kick)
Duke – Jerry Kocourek 5-yard pass from Jerry Barger (Nelson kick)
Third quarter
Nebraska – Don Comstock 3-yard run (Bob Smith kick)
Duke – Sonny Sorrell 5-yard pass from Barger (kick failed)
Fourth quarter
Duke – Nick McKeithan 1-yard run (Nelson kick)
Duke – Sam Eberdt 3-yard run (Nelson kick)

Statistics
{| class=wikitable style="text-align:center"
! Statistics !! Duke !! Nebraska
|-
|First Downs	||23	||6
|-
|Rushes–yards	||64–288||34–84
|-
|Passing yards	||82	||26
|-
|Passes (C–A–I) || 7–13–0 || 1–9–2 
|-
|Total Offense	||77–370||43–110
|-
|Punts–average	||5–26.6||7–28.9
|-
|Fumbles–lost 	||2–1	||0–0
|-
|Turnovers	||1	||2
|-
|Penalties–yards||2–30	||2–20
|}

References

Rose Bowl
Orange Bowl
Duke Blue Devils football bowl games
Nebraska Cornhuskers football bowl games
January 1955 sports events in the United States
Orange Bowl